A cottage window is a double-hung window — i.e., a window with two sashes sliding up and down, hung with one atop the other in the same frame — in which the  upper sash is smaller (shorter) than the lower one. 

The upper sash often contains smaller lights divided by muntins (often known as a "divided light pattern" or "grille"), although in some cases both sashes may be divided. 

Cottage windows are especially characteristic of bungalow or Craftsman-style houses. It is also called a "front window". 

Windows
Architectural styles
Architectural design
Architectural history
Architectural elements